Four-pointer may refer to:

Four-point play, a rare play in basketball 
Four-pointer, an association football cliché - see Six-pointer